The Duha prayer is the voluntary Islamic prayer between the obligatory Islamic prayers of Fajr and Dhuhr. The time for the prayer begins when the sun has risen to the height of a spear, which is fifteen or twenty minutes after sunrise, until just before the sun passes its zenith (after the zenith is when the time for dhuhr prayer begins). When prayed at the beginning of its time it is called Ishraaq prayer. Salat al Duha is done to forgive sins and as a form of charity. Abu Dharr reports that Prophet Muhammad Sallalahu Alaihi Wasallam said: "Charity is required from every part of your body daily. Every saying of 'Glory to be to Allah' is a charity. Every saying of 'Praise be to Allah' is charity. Every saying of 'There is no God but Allah' is charity. Every saying 'Allah is the Greatest' is charity. Ordering the good is charity. Eradicating evil is charity. And what suffices for that (as a charity) are the two rak'as of Duha." This is related by Ahmad, Muslim, and Abu Daw'ud. It is also known in Bengali as Chashter Namaz (চাশতের নামাজ) and in Urdu as Namāz-e-Chāsht (نماز چاشت). It can be prayed either for four raka'ats or till 6 raka'ats. If praying four raka'ats it should be split into two.

See also
Dua
Nafl prayer
Salat

References

Salah
Salah terminology